Gangarides is a genus of moths of the family Notodontidae described by Frederic Moore in 1866.

Selected species
Gangarides brunneus Schintlmeister, 1994
Gangarides dharma Moore, [1866]
Gangarides flavescens Schintlmeister, 1997
Gangarides gigantea (Druce, 1909)
Gangarides rosea (Walker, 1865)
Gangarides rufinus Schintlmeister, 1997
Gangarides splendidus Schintlmeister, 1994
Gangarides sugii Schintlmeister, 1993
Gangarides sugii negrosanus Kobayashi & Kishida, 2008
Gangarides sugii palawanensis Kobayashi & Kishida, 2008
Gangarides sugii pulcher Kobayashi & Kishida, 2008
Gangarides vardena C. Swinhoe, 1892
Gangarides vittipalpis (Walker, 1869)
Gangarides wallacei Kobayashi & Kishida, 2008

References

Notodontidae